Prince Nikita Nikitich Romanov (13 May 1923 – 3 May 2007) was a British born, American historian and writer, author of a book about Ivan the Terrible. He was a member of the Romanov family, a son of Prince Nikita Alexandrovich of Russia and a great nephew of Nicholas II of Russia, the last Tsar.

Russian prince
He was born in London the son of Prince Nikita Alexandrovich of Russia and his wife Countess Mariya Ilarianovna Vorontzova-Daschkova. Prince Nikita was a grandson of Grand Duchess Xenia Alexandrovna and Grand Duke Alexander Mikhailovich of Russia and a great nephew of the last Russian Emperor, Nicholas II. He had one younger brother Prince Alexander Nikitich and together they spent their early years in Britain.

After serving in the British Army, Prince Nikita moved to the U.S. He attended the University of California, Berkeley where he graduated as a Master of Arts in history. He later taught history at San Francisco State University. In 1975 Prince Nikita co-authored the book Ivan the Terrible with Robert Payne.

Prince Nikita was married to Jane Anna Schoenwald (24 April 1933, Oklahoma City — 28 January 2017, Cairo) on 14 July 1961 in London, and they had one son.
Prince Fedor Nikitich Romanoff (1974–2007), a vegan who studied classical, Egyptian, and ancient languages at Columbia and Brown universities, where he received a master's degree with honors. He committed suicide by jumping from a window in Pompano Beach, Florida on 25 August 2007.

Nikita died a few months before his son, after suffering a stroke in New York City.

Ancestry

References

External links
Romanov Family Association

1923 births
2007 deaths
Nikita
University of California, Berkeley alumni
British emigrants to the United States